Pigeon Toss, or in Britain Pap, Penny Up, and Pitch and Toss in Rudyard Kipling's poem "If -", Keeley (Scotland), "Nippy (Wales)", Chucks, Quarters, “Tinks” or "Jingies" is a game played with coins. Players take turns to throw a coin at a wall, from some distance away, and the coin which lands closest to the wall is the winner.

The history of the game is ancient, and it is known to have been played by Ancient Greek children using bronze coins. In modern Israel the game is also played with Apricot kernels, and is called "Gogoim".

References

External links 
Boy Scout activity
Family Education Variants

Coin games
Throwing games